Mayilpeelikkavu is a 1998 Indian Malayalam-language mystery thriller film directed by the Anil-Babu duo and starring Kunchacko Boban and Jomol. This is the third film of Kunchacko Boban and it is about reincarnation and revenge. The movie has many similarities with the 1991 American movie Dead Again. It was one of the first Indian movies to have an internet website.

Plot

Years ago, a teenage girl, Kuttimani was brutally murdered, in an orthodox rich Kerala family. After years Manu realizes that he is the reincarnation of Krishnanunni, who was framed and executed for the murder of his lover Kuttimani. He tries to find the truth, along with convincing Gayathry, who is the reincarnation of Kuttimani. What happens when history repeats itself and Manu and Gayathri too fall in love along the way?

Cast

Soundtrack 
The film's soundtrack contains nine songs, all composed by Berny Ignatius, with lyrics by S. Ramesan Nair.

Trivia
In this film Kunchacko Boban and Jomol are paired for the first time in their career.
Both the hero and heroine play double roles in this movie.

See also 
 List of Malayalam horror films

References

External links
 

Indian remakes of American films
Films shot in Thiruvananthapuram
1998 films
1990s Malayalam-language films
Films about reincarnation
Films scored by Berny–Ignatius